San Leone may refer to various places, jurisdictions and people:

 Saint Leo (disambiguation) 
 Saint-Léon (disambiguation)
 San Leone (see), a former bishopric in Calabria (Italy), nominally restored as Catholic titular see
 a suburb of the modern Agrigento on Sicily (Italy)
 San Leone (river), a river in the Province of the river Agrigento, Sicily, Italy